Scarlet was a monthly women's magazine with a focus on sex topics run by Helix Media until it was relaunched in November 2004 with the tag line, "the new magazine for women who get it". It was published by Blaze Publishing Ltd, then sold to Interactive Publishing. It was distributed UK-wide at retailers such as W H Smith, Tesco, Superdrug and Somerfield. It is currently being republished as a digital only magazine by a new publishing company called Scarlet Media Limited.

Scarlet went into liquidation and ceased publication in June 2010. It has recently been bought by a new publishing company, called Scarlet Media Limited, to launch as a digital only magazine.

Intentions 
Scarlet claims to empower women to lead healthier lives through "frank informative features that talk to the readers the way women talk to each other when men aren't around." Its fiction section 'attempts to promote safe sex through eroticising condom use. launched a campaign against Fatism in the media. Scarlet has received positive reviews in UK daily newspapers The Times and The Guardian.

References 

Monthly magazines published in the United Kingdom
Defunct women's magazines published in the United Kingdom
Magazines established in 2004
Magazines disestablished in 2010